Niue is subdivided into 14 villages (that is, municipalities). Each village has a village council that elects its chairman. The villages are at the same time electoral districts. Each village sends an assemblyman to the Parliament of Niue.

List
The table lists the villages with population and area. These are the administrative subdivisions of Niue. Some of them include smaller settlements and hamlets.

The villages Alofi North and Alofi South together serve as the capital of Niue, Alofi (pop. 614). In the following table, the villages are listed in clockwise sequence.

References

External links

 
Niue
Niue
Niue-related lists